Dov Karmi (‎1905 – 14 May 1962) was an architect of Mandate Palestine and Israel.

Biography
Dov Karmi was born in 1905, the son of Hannah and Sholom Weingarten, in Zhvanets, Russian Empire. In 1921 the Weingartens emigrated with their children to  Mandatory Palestine, the future State of Israel.

He initially studied art at the Bezalel School of Art and Craft, Jerusalem, but was attracted to architecture and went to Belgium to complete his studies in this field at Ghent University.

Karmi worked in partnership with several other architects, including Zeev Rechter and, later in life, with his son Ram Karmi. During his professional career he designed more than two hundred buildings, mostly in Tel Aviv . Karmi's main style was modernist; he influenced a generation of Israeli architects.

Israel Prize
In 1957, Karmi was awarded the Israel Prize, for architecture, the first recipient of the Prize in this field.

Family
Karmi married Haia Maklev; the couple had two children, both of whom became notable architects. In 2002, Karmi's son, Ram Karmi, was awarded the Israel Prize for architecture and Carmi's daughter, Ada Karmi-Melamede, was awarded the Israel Prize for architecture, in 2007.

Major buildings
Max-Liebling House, Tel Aviv, 1936
Culture Palace, Tel Aviv, 1957 (with Zeev Rechter and Yaakov Rechter)

Contributions
 The Knesset (Jerusalem, 1958-1966) was built after an initial plan by Joseph Klarwein, with modifications by Shimon Powsner, Dov and Ram Karmi, Bill Gillitt, and an interior design by Dora Gad.

See also
List of Israel Prize recipients

References

External links

Architects in Mandatory Palestine
Israeli architects
Architects from Odesa
Bezalel Academy of Arts and Design alumni
Ghent University alumni
Israel Prize in architecture recipients
Soviet emigrants to Mandatory Palestine
Odesa Jews
1905 births
1962 deaths
20th-century Israeli architects